Tuhami al-Wazzani (1903–1972) was a Moroccan historian from Tétouan. He is especially well known for his autobiography Al-Zawiyya. This book was first published in episodes in the magazine Al-Rif (founded by him August 27, 1936), beginning in 1939. Al-Wazzani translated Cervantes' Don Quixote into Arabic.

References

Francisco Rodríguez Sierra, "Apuntes para un acercamiento sistémico a la obra de Tuhami al-Wazzani: la zagüía entre la autobiografía y la novela", in: Al-Andalus Magreb: Estudios árabes e islámicos, Nº 12, 2005, pags. 129-146
Francisco Rodríguez Sierra, "La traducción del Quijote al árabe del tetuaní Tuhami al-Wazzani", in: Don Quijote por tierras extranjeras: Estudios sobre la recepción internacional de la novela cervantina / coord. por Hans Christian Hagedorn, 2007, pags. 141-152

20th-century Moroccan historians
Moroccan autobiographers
Moroccan translators
1903 births
1972 deaths
People from Tétouan
20th-century translators